The 1945 Pensacola Naval Air Station Goslings football team represented the Pensacola Naval Air Station during the 1945 college football season. Led by head coach Curt Youel, the Goslings compiled a 2–7–1 record.

Schedule

References

Pensacola Naval Air Station
Pensacola Naval Air Station Goslings football
Pensacola Naval Air Station Goslings football